Nile Omari Mckenzie John (born 6 March 2003) is an English professional footballer who plays as a midfielder for Premier League club Tottenham.

Club career

Tottenham Hotspur
John made his professional debut on 24 February 2021 for Tottenham coming on in as a substitute in the Europa League game against Wolfsberger AC which ended 4–0.

On 19 August 2021, John made his first start for Tottenham by playing in the inaugural UEFA Europa Conference League competition against Paços de Ferreira, which ended in a 1–0 defeat.

Charlton Athletic (loan)
On 27 January 2022, John joined Charlton Athletic on loan for the rest of the 2021–22 season. He sat on the bench on a number of occasions without playing a competitive match for Charlton.

International career
Having represented England from U15 to U17 level, John made his debut for the England U19s during a 2–0 victory over Italy U19s at St. George's Park on 2 September 2021.

Career statistics

References

2003 births
Living people
English footballers
England youth international footballers
Association football defenders
Tottenham Hotspur F.C. players
Charlton Athletic F.C. players
Black British sportspeople